
Antimachus of Teos was an early Greek epic poet. According to Plutarch, he observed a solar eclipse in 753 BC, the same year in which Rome was founded. The epic Epigoni, a sequel to the legend of Thebes, was apparently sometimes ascribed to Antimachus of Teos. However, confusion is possible with the much later literary poet Antimachus of Colophon (c. 400 BC), who wrote an epic Thebais on what must have been an overlapping subject.

Select editions and translations

Critical editions
 .
 .
 .
 .

Translations
 . (The link is to the 1st edition of 1914.) English translation with facing Greek text; now obsolete except for its translations of the ancient quotations.
 . Greek text with facing English translation

References

Sources
 .

Early Greek epic poets
8th-century BC Greek people
8th-century BC poets
Poets of ancient Ionia
Year of birth unknown
Year of death unknown